The Morgan State Bears men's basketball team represents Morgan State University, located in Baltimore, Maryland, in Division I basketball competition. They currently compete in the Mid-Eastern Athletic Conference. The Bears are currently coached by Kevin Broadus and play their home games at the Talmadge L. Hill Field House (4,250). They were the 1974 NCAA Division II national champions.

History
The program hosted the first interracial American basketball game played south of the Mason–Dixon line on February 12, 1952, a 65–63 loss to Loyola College in Maryland.

Post-season

NCAA Division I Tournament results
The Bears have appeared in two NCAA Division I Tournaments. Their combined record is 0–2.

National Invitation Tournament results
The Bears have appeared in one National Invitation Tournament. Their combined record is 0–1.

The Basketball Classic results
The Bears have appeared in The Basketball Classic one time. Their record is 0–1.

NCAA Division II Tournament results
The Bears have appeared in three NCAA Division II Tournaments. Their combined record is 6–3. They were national champions in 1974.

Notable former players
Reggie Holmes *All-Time Leading Scorer, AP All-American
Marvin Webster *3× MEAC Player of the Year (1973–1975)
DeWayne Jackson *All-American 
Justin Black *2x First-Team All-MEAC, All-American

References

3.https://www.slamonline.com/college-hs/justin-black-morgan-state/

External links
 Morgan State men's basketball athletics page